The 2011 Rugby World Cup Final was a rugby union match between France and New Zealand, to determine the winner of the 2011 Rugby World Cup. The match took place on 23 October 2011 at Eden Park, in Auckland, New Zealand. New Zealand won the match 8–7, the slimmest margin by which any Rugby World Cup final has been decided.

New Zealand were favourites, as they went into the final unbeaten and the French had lost two pool games, including one to New Zealand. The French team also experienced a player revolt against their coach Marc Lièvremont, confirmed after the tournament by veteran back-rower Imanol Harinordoquy. The match was a close-fought and tight contest with few line-breaks. Each side scored one try and the outcome was determined by kicks – the All Blacks kicked a penalty goal while the French managed only the conversion of their try. The result was the lowest score of any World Cup final.

The match echoed the 1987 Rugby World Cup Final which was also held at Eden Park between the same teams. As in the 2007 final, both teams had progressed from the same pool.

New Zealand's victory marked the first time that a nation had held both the men's World Cup and Women's Rugby World Cup, as the Black Ferns had won the 2010 tournament.

Path to the final

Match summary

Choice of colours 
France won the toss for choice of colours ahead of the final at Eden Park, but agreed to play in their white change kit to allow New Zealand to play in their traditional all-black kit.

Haka and French response 
After the national anthems, the New Zealand players performed their traditional haka as the French team stared back and then advanced towards them in a V-shaped formation before fanning out into a straight line. The French had decided to meet the haka in this fashion on Sunday morning, and French captain Thierry Dusautoir stated that "it was a great moment". They were later fined £2,500 by the IRB for crossing the half-way line, a decision that was labeled "pedantic" and the "final insult".

First half 
In a match of "grim physical attrition", New Zealand scored first. From a line-out in the French 22, Tony Woodcock received the ball and broke through a hole in the French defence to score his first try of the World Cup. Piri Weepu, who had already missed a penalty kick, failed with his conversion effort. Weepu missed another attempt in the 25th minute. Nine minutes later, New Zealand's Aaron Cruden, the team's third choice fly-half, only playing due to injuries to Dan Carter and Colin Slade, hyper-extended his knee, and was replaced by Stephen Donald. The French were forced to defend stoically for much of the first half, due to New Zealand playing a good running game, but late in the half François Trinh-Duc missed a drop goal attempt and had a run to the line cut off by Weepu.

Second half 
The French came back into the game in the second half, although it did not begin well for them: Dimitri Yachvili missed the team's first penalty attempt after two minutes, and Stephen Donald pushed New Zealand further into the lead by successfully kicking a penalty two minutes later. The French reacted straight away: Trinh-Duc made a run towards the line, and after several attempts, Dusautoir scored a try, which Trinh-Duc converted to take the score to 8–7. Trinh-Duc attempted a penalty kick from 48 metres in the 65th minute, but missed the goal, and thereafter there were few chances for either side. The French captain, Dusautoir, who was described as "enjoying a heroic game in defence" by The Daily Telegraphs Brendan Gallagher, was named man of the match.

Another historic milestone occurred when Jean-Marc Doussain came on as a late substitute for France. He became the first player ever to make his Test debut in a Rugby World Cup Final.

Match details

Statistics

Refereeing controversy 
Craig Joubert's refereeing was heavily criticised by the French team and many international observers. Greg Growden writing for The Sydney Morning Herald accused Joubert of "ignoring offside play and breakdown indiscretions that should have cost the home team penalties". Hugh Farrelly interviewed in The Irish Independent stated laconically that "France were significantly better over 80 minutes" and "Craig Joubert did not referee evenly" and "some of the decisions were disgraceful for a game of this magnitude". On the other hand, former French referee Joël Jutge reviewed 24 instances of the game and concluded 17 times Joubert made the correct decisions, four incorrect decisions favoured the All Blacks and three incorrect decisions favoured the French.

Richie McCaw and New Zealand coach Graham Henry pointed out that New Zealand had deliberately tried to play the game in a way that did not result in them conceding penalties, especially in the second half. After the game McCaw expressed surprise that Aurélien Rougerie was not cited by the IRB for gouging at his eyes and noted that the final became "filthy" as it went on but made no mention of Joubert or his performance.

Dramatisation 
In July 2013, it was announced that a made-for-TV movie, to be called "The Kick", would be made. The telemovie focused on Stephen Donald, and his successful penalty kick early in the second half that ultimately provided the winning points. Donald had been unwanted for the All Blacks squad prior to the final, due to some previous poor international performances. However, injuries to Carter, Slade (both earlier in the tournament), Cruden and Weepu led to the opportunity for a "charming story of redemption". David de Lautour was cast as Donald. The movie debuted on New Zealand television on 10 August 2014.

References

External links

2011
Final
2011–12 in French rugby union
Final
France national rugby union team matches
New Zealand national rugby union team matches
History of rugby union matches between France and New Zealand